Luis Fernández de Córdoba  (February 1555 – 26 June 1625) was a Roman Catholic prelate who served as Archbishop of Seville (1624–1625), Archbishop of Santiago de Compostela (1622–1624), Bishop of Málaga (1615–1622), and Bishop of Salamanca (1603–1615).

Biography
Luis Fernández de Córdoba was born in Córdoba, Andalusia, Spain in February 1555.
On 20 November 1602, he was appointed during the papacy of Pope Clement VIII as Bishop of Salamanca.
On 9 February 1603, he was consecrated bishop by Domenico Ginnasi, Archbishop of Manfredonia, with Juan Bautista Acevedo Muñoz, Bishop of Valladolid, and Domingo de Oña, Bishop of Coro, serving as co-consecrators. 
On 9 February 1615, he was appointed during the papacy of Pope Paul V as Bishop of Malaga.
On 26 October 1622, he was appointed during the papacy of Pope Gregory XV as Archbishop of Santiago de Compostela.
On 11 March 1624, he was appointed during the papacy of Pope Urban VIII as Archbishop of Seville.
He served as Archbishop of Seville until his death on 26 June 1625.

Episcopal succession
While bishop, he was the principal consecrator of:
Pedro Ponce de Léon, Bishop of Ciudad Rodrigo (1605); 
Agustín Antolínez, Bishop of Ciudad Rodrigo (1623); 
Gonzalo del Campo (López de Ocampo), Archbishop of Lima (1624);
 
and the principal co-consecrator of:
Antonio Corrionero, Bishop of Islas Canarias (1615).

References

External links and additional sources
 (for Chronology of Bishops) 
 (for Chronology of Bishops) 
 (for Chronology of Bishops) 
 (for Chronology of Bishops) 
 (for Chronology of Bishops) 
 (for Chronology of Bishops) 
 (for Chronology of Bishops) 
 (for Chronology of Bishops) 

17th-century Roman Catholic archbishops in Spain
Bishops appointed by Pope Clement VIII
Bishops appointed by Pope Paul V
Bishops appointed by Pope Gregory XV
Bishops appointed by Pope Urban VIII
1555 births
1625 deaths